The 1980 Kansas State Wildcats football team represented Kansas State University in the 1980 NCAA Division I-A football season.  The team's head football coach was Jim Dickey.   The Wildcats played their home games in KSU Stadium.

1980 was the second time in school history that the Wildcats were shut out three times in one season, the only other time being in 1975.  The Wildcats were shut out by LSU, Tulsa, Oklahoma State.

Schedule

^ Kansas mistakenly counts this as a win.  Kansas was forced by the Big Eight Conference to forfeit this game after beating Kansas State on the field, 20–18.  Kerwin Bell, a Kansas running back was later determined to be ineligible at the time of the game.

Roster

References

Kansas State
Kansas State Wildcats football seasons
Kansas State Wildcats football